Drago  is a wool mill founded in 1973 by Umberto and Laura Drago in Biella, Italy. Their son, Paolo Drago, is the current President and CEO. The mill produces 1,750,000 meters of fabrics per year. Drago fabrics are exported all over the world. Drago sells some fabric under its own brand, but sells mainly under other brand labels.

References

See also
Ermenegildo Zegna
Loro Piana
Dormeuil
Holland & Sherry
Carlo Barbera
Cerruti

Companies of Italy
Textile companies of Italy
Luxury brands